Mark Broom (born 6 May 1971) is a British techno DJ and music producer.

Life and career 
During the Second Summer of Love in 1989 Broom was travelling to Tenerife, where he first heard music genres like Chicago house and Acid house. At his return to the UK he bought his first turntables and started his musical career. He regularly visited the London record store FatCat Records and was introduced to Baby Ford as well as Ed Handley and Andy Turner from Black Dog Productions. Broom became a DJ in Ford's club Nude. Together with Handley and Turner he released a few records for General Production Recordings.

While Broom first was mainly associated with intelligent techno, he later focused on dancefloor oriented productions. Broom and fellow musician Dave Hill in 1994 founded Pure Plastic Recordings, at which Broom's debut album Angie Is A Shoplifter was released in 1996. Broom, Hill, Handley and Turner also released one album and several singles under the moniker Repeat.

Hill and Broom also founded the project Rue East and released the albums Summer of Blood (1998) and Indoor Culture (2001). Both continued to release their music as a duo under different project names such as Midnight Funk Association, Sympletic, Visitor, Voyectra, and White Lines.

In general Broom has kept a relatively low media profile.

Discography (selected) 
Albums
 1995: Repeat – Repeats (A13)
 1996: Mark Broom – Angie Is A Shoplifter (Pure Plastic)
 1998: Rue East – Summer of Blood (Pure Plastic)
 2001: Rue East – Indoor Culture
 2010: Mark Broom – Acid House (Saved Records)
 2021: Mark Broom – Fünfzig (Rekids)

References

External links 
 
 

1971 births
Living people
English electronic musicians
English techno musicians
English DJs
BPitch Control artists
Techno musicians
Electronic dance music DJs